George Karpati,  (May 17, 1934 – February 6, 2009) was a Canadian neurologist and neuroscientist who was one of the leading experts on the diagnosis and treatment of neuromuscular disorders including muscular dystrophy research.

Born in Debrecen, Hungary, Karpati was a Holocaust survivor who emigrated to Canada in 1957. He received an M.D. from Dalhousie University in 1960. Karpati spent 30 years in clinical practise, research and teaching of neurology. He was the Izaak Walton Killam Chair and Professor of Neurology at McGill University.

In 2001, he was made an Officer of the Order of Canada for his "seminal contributions in the area of muscular dystrophy". In 2005, he was made a Knight of the National Order of Quebec. In 1999, he was made a Fellow of the Royal Society of Canada. He was a member of the Royal Society of Canada and the Hungarian Academy of Sciences.

Karpati died on February 6, 2009, aged 74, and was buried in Montreal at the Baron de Hirsch Cemetery.

References 

1934 births
2009 deaths
Canadian neuroscientists
Canadian people of Hungarian-Jewish descent
Hungarian neuroscientists
Jewish Canadian scientists
Fellows of the Royal Society of Canada
Academic staff of McGill University
Knights of the National Order of Quebec
Officers of the Order of Canada
Holocaust survivors
Hungarian Jews
Jewish Canadian writers
Hungarian emigrants to Canada
Naturalized citizens of Canada
People from Debrecen
Members of the Hungarian Academy of Sciences